"Bop Bop!" (stylized in all caps) is a song recorded by South Korean girl group Viviz for their debut extended play Beam of Prism. It was released as the lead single by BPM Entertainment on February 9, 2022. "Bop Bop!" was written by Hwang Yu-bin and Mi Lee-mu (PaperMaker), composed by Lim Soo-ho (PaperMaker), Woong Kim (PaperMaker), Anna Timgren, and PaperMaker, and arranged by Lim Soo-ho (PaperMaker) and Woong Kim (PaperMaker).

Background and release
On October 6, 2021, it was announced that Eunha, SinB, and Umji, who were former members of GFriend, has signed with BPM Entertainment and would be debuting as a trio. On January 24, 2022, BPM Entertainment announced the trio would be making their debut on February 9, 2022, with the release of their first extended play Beam of Prism. On February 2, the track listing was released with "Bop Bop!" announced as the lead single. Four days later, the highlight teaser video was released. On February 7, the first music video teaser was released. On April 28, Viviz released remixes of "Bop Bop!" in collaboration with Belgian DJ Yves V.

Composition
"Bop Bop!" was written by Hwang Yu-bin and Mi Lee-mu (PaperMaker), composed and arranged by Lim Soo-ho (PaperMaker), Woong Kim (PaperMaker), with PaperMaker with Anna Timgren. The song was described as a "hybrid" pop dance song with "Latin-style rhythm and disco [rhythm]" with lyrics about "[the group's] aspiration to enjoy music". "Bop Bop!" was composed in the key of C major, with a tempo of 126 beats per minute.

Commercial performance
"Bop Bop!" debuted at number 114 on South Korea's Gaon Digital Chart in the chart issue dated February 6–12, 2022; on its component charts, the song debuted at number 4 and 73 on the Gaon Download Chart and Gaon BGM Chart, respectively. It ascended to number 102 on the Gaon Digital Chart in the following week. On the Billboard K-pop Hot 100, the song debuted at number 78 in the chart issue dated February 26, 2022, ascending to number 60 in the chart issue dated March 19, 2022. In United States,  the song debuted at number five on the Billboard World Digital Song Sales in the chart issue dated May 14, 2022.

Promotion
Prior to the extended play's release, on February 9, 2022, Viviz held a debut showcase to introduce Beam of Prism along with its lead single "Bop Bop!". Following the release of the extended play, the group performed "Bop Bop!" on two music programs: Mnet's M Countdown on February 10, and on February 17 where they won the first place, and SBS's Inkigayo on February 20. On April 27, Viviz performed "Bop Bop!" at The Recording Academy's Grammy Global Spin.

Track listing 
 Digital download / streaming – Original
 "Bop Bop!" – 3:39

 Digital download / streaming – Yves V remix
 "Bop Bop!" (Yves V remix) – 3:12
 "Bop Bop!" (Yves V remix extended) – 4:12
 "Bop Bop!" (Yves V remix instrumental) – 4:12

Accolades

Credits and personnels
 Hwang Yu-bin – lyrics
 Mi Lee-mu (PaperMaker) – lyrics
 Lim Soo-ho (PaperMaker) – composition, arrangement
 Woong Kim (PaperMaker) – composition, arrangement
 Anna Timgren – composition
 PaperMaker – composition, arrangement

Charts

Weekly chart

Monthly charts

Accolades

Release history

References

Viviz songs
2022 singles
2022 songs
2022 debut singles
Korean-language songs